Anati Saqanyan  (born on December 2, 1991) is an Armenian broadcaster, model and actress. She is known for her roles as Ruzanna on Full House, Sisianoush on Stone Cage.

Filmography

References

External links 
 

1991 births
Living people
Actresses from Yerevan
Armenian film actresses
21st-century Armenian actresses